Cephaloleia lepida is a species of rolled-leaf beetle in the family Chrysomelidae, first found in Panama.

References

Further reading

McKenna, Duane D., and Brian D. Farrell. "Molecular phylogenetics and evolution of host plant use in the Neotropical rolled leaf ‘hispine’beetle genus Cephaloleia (Chevrolat)(Chrysomelidae: Cassidinae)." Molecular Phylogenetics and Evolution 37.1 (2005): 117–131.
Staines, Charles L., and Carlos García-Robledo. "The genus Cephaloleia Chevrolat, 1836 (Coleoptera, Chrysomelidae, Cassidinae)." ZooKeys 436 (2014): 1.

External links

Cassidinae
Beetles of Central America